The 1993 French Supertouring Championship (championnat de France de Supertourisme 1993 in French) is the nineteenth edition of the French Supertouring Championship, the first run with the FIA Supertouring regulations. The season began in Nogaro on 12 April and finished on the same track on 10 October. The championship was won by Frank Biela driving an Audi 80 Quattro for the ROC Compétition team.

Teams and drivers

Calendar

Championship standings 

Only finishes in the top 6 are shown.

Drivers' championship

References 
Haymarket/Autosport Touring Car Year 1993-94

External links 
1993 Drivers List
1993 Standings

Seasons in touring car racing
French Supertouring Championship